"Why?" is a single by British synth-pop band Bronski Beat and appeared on their 1984 album The Age of Consent.

The song, recorded at RPM Studio in New York City and mixed at Townhouse Studios in London, pursued an energetic musical formula, while the lyrics focused more centrally on anti-gay prejudice. The song opens with a questioning vocal by frontman and vocalist Jimmy Somerville and the shattering of breaking glass. It was the trio's second Top 10 success in the UK, throughout Europe and in Australia and is today considered a popular gay anthem.

Single cover
The drawing for the single cover, of a man with his head in his hands, was drawn for the band by Glasgow artist Robert McAulay, who was associated with the band at the time.

Reception
Reviewing the song for Melody Maker, Adam Sweeting described it as "all rather twisted and tragic, especially when sung by those painfully keening vocals (the song is dedicated to murdered gay playwright Drew Griffiths). Like Soft Cell before them, the Bronskingtons suit this frugal format better than most, basically because they've had the guts to go the whole hog". Sweeting adds that "what would be predictable electroboredom in more ineffectual outfits here takes on the status of obsession, building busily towards a tense and involving climax".

Reviewing for Smash Hits, Dave Rimmer wrote "this was written for Martin, a friend of the Bronskis who was hounded out of the country by his boyfriend's irate and violent parents" and described it as "a worthy follow-up to "Smalltown Boy"". Dave Ling for Number One agreed with this last point and wrote that the song "could almost be a sequel to their debut, continuing the tale of a young gay suffering humiliation and animosity as he tries to live his life".

In Record Mirror, the song was described as "flowing with unchained melodies, and dealing a deadly double blow to your heart and (shoe) souls" and that "it sounds something akin to Sylvester meets Pigbag in a battle for dancefloor supremacy".

Track and format listing

Chart performance

Weekly charts

Year-end charts

Cover versions
In 2006, Supermode released "Tell Me Why", containing lyrics from "Why?" and melodic samples from another Bronski Beat track entitled "Smalltown Boy".
British electronic musician Andi Fraggs has been performing "Why?" on his live shows and has named it his "favourite gay anthem".

References

1984 singles
1984 songs
Bronski Beat songs
LGBT-related songs
London Records singles
Songs written by Jimmy Somerville
Song recordings produced by Mike Thorne